Fred Roar Syversen (born 1966) is a Norwegian freeskier.

In 2008 he unintentionally set a world record by performing a 107 meters (352 ft) high jump in the Alps.

References

External links
 Video of the jump by Fred Syversen, in the "Perfect Moment" documentary, on YouTube (uploaded by Nuit2laglisse)

1966 births
Living people